In chemistry, the cage effect (also known as geminate recombination) describes how the properties of a molecule are affected by its surroundings. First introduced by Franck and Rabinowitch  in 1934, the cage effect suggests that instead of acting as an individual particle, molecules in solvent are more accurately described as an encapsulated particle. The encapsulated molecules or radicals are called cage pairs or geminate pairs. In order to interact with other molecules, the caged particle must diffuse from its solvent cage. The typical lifetime of a solvent cage is 10 seconds. Many manifestations of the cage effect exist.

In free radical polymerization, radicals formed from the decomposition of an initiator molecule are surrounded by a cage consisting of solvent and/or monomer molecules.  Within the cage, the free radicals undergo  many collisions leading to their recombination or mutual deactivation. This can be described by the following reaction:

After recombination, free radicals can either react with monomer molecules within the cage walls or diffuse out of the cage. In polymers, the probability of a free radical pair to escape recombination in the cage is 0.1 – 0.01 and 0.3-0.8 in liquids. In unimolecular chemistry, geminate recombination has first been studied in the solution phase using iodine molecules and heme proteins. In the solid state, geminate recombination has been demonstrated with small molecules trapped in noble gas solid matrices and in triiodide crystalline compounds.

Cage recombination efficiency 

The cage effect can be quantitatively described as the cage recombination efficiency  Fc where:

Here Fc is defined as the ratio of the rate constant for cage recombination (kc) to the sum of the rate constants for all cage processes. According to mathematical models, Fc is dependent on changes on several parameters including radical size, shape, and solvent viscosity. It is reported that the cage effect will increase with an increase in radical size and a decrease in radical mass.

Initiator efficiency 

In free radical polymerization, the rate of initiation is dependent on how effective the initiator is.  Low initiator efficiency, ƒ, is largely attributed to the cage effect. The rate of initiation is described as:

 

where Ri is the rate of initiation, kd is the rate constant for initiator dissociation,  [I] is the initial concentration of initiator. Initiator efficiency represents the fraction of primary radicals R·, that actually contribute to chain initiation. Due to the cage effect, free radicals can undergo mutual deactivation which produces stable products instead of initiating propagation – reducing the value of ƒ.

See also 
 Solvent effects
 Carrier generation and recombination
 Rate-determining step

References 

Chemistry theories
Theoretical chemistry
Reaction mechanisms